The Charlotte Maxeke Johannesburg Academic Hospital is an accredited general hospital in Parktown, Johannesburg, Gauteng, South Africa.

Size and capability
The main structure was opened in 1979.

The facility has 1,088 usable beds. The hospital's professional and support staff exceeds 4,000 people.

Training
It is also the main teaching hospital for the University of the Witwatersrand, faculty of Health Sciences. The institution provides the service base for undergraduate and post-graduate training in all areas of health professions.

The joint staff produces world-class research and collaborates with several universities on the continent and abroad. The hospital offers a full range of tertiary, secondary and highly specialized services.

The costs of providing these services to the population of Gauteng Province, in addition to the neighbouring provinces, are funded by a National Tertiary Services Grant, as well as Provincial allocation.

The hospital also serves as a referral hospital for a number of hospitals in its referral chain.

Establishment
The facility was built by Concor on the site of Hohenheim, the first Parktown mansion, the home of Sir Lionel and Lady Florence Phillips.

Issues
In 2012 the Sunday Times of South Africa reported on a critical shortage of equipment and manpower that compromised medical care. In 2022 the hospital was over R200 million in arrears with its bills for municipal services.

2021 fire 
The hospital's parking structure caught on fire on the morning of 17 April 2021. The fire started in a storeroom for dry surgical supplies, according to officials. Flames were thought to have been extinguished but reignited later that same day, collapsing the third level of the parking garage. This necessitated the evacuation and closure of the hospital for seven days. The fire destroyed an estimated R40 million worth of medical stock and personal protective equipment.

The following month, it was revealed that although the hospital did not comply with fire safety standards, it had passed a fitness audit earlier in the year. Johannesburg's Emergency Management Services claimed that the firefighting equipment inside the hospital had no water although the Gauteng health department claimed that the provincial Department of Infrastructure had audited the building in late 2020. Smoke doors, used to prevent the spread of smoke in a building in the event of a fire, had been recommissioned because their magnets had stopped working; fire hydrant couplings had been stolen and so were not compatible with the fire hoses on fire engines; fire suppression systems were not working; and fire exits had been locked due to security concerns. It was later discovered that the hospital had not been evaluated for fire safety since 2017, four years prior to the fire.

While the building underwent assessments and awaited compliance certificates in May, R30 million worth of copper piping that made up its water systems was stolen, and televisions in the paediatric oncology unit were also taken.

The oncology unit was the first to reopen on 28 June 2021.

Clinical departments
Nursing
Department  Medicine 
Cardiology
Neurology
Pulmonology
Haemotology and Oncology
Dermatology
Gastro
Geriatrics
Family Health
Nephrology
Hepatology
Endocrinology
Department of Surgery 
Otorhinolaryngology
Paediatric surgery
Urology
Trauma Unit
Plastic and Reconstructive surgery
Cardiothoracic surgery
Maxillo-facial and Oral surgery
Neurosurgery
Department of Nuclear Medicine
Department of Orthopaedics
Department of Ophthalmology
Department of Anaesthesia
Department of Radiation Therapy
Department of Paediatrics and Child Health
Department of Radiology – Diagnostics
Department of Obstetrics and Gynaecology
Department of Psychiatry and Mental Health

Allied medical departments
Dietary Services
Occupational Therapy
Pharmacy 
Physiotherapy
Speech Therapy & Audiology
Social Work
Clinical Technology

Coat of arms
The hospital registered a coat of arms at the Bureau of Heraldry in 1980 : Azure, on a Latin cross nowy, the arms potent and the  foot throughout, Argent, a pomme charged with a gold stamp Or, between on the arms three potents and on the foot a rod of Aesculapius, Vert, the rod entwined of a serpent Or.

References

Teaching hospitals in South Africa
Buildings and structures in Johannesburg
University of the Witwatersrand
Medical education in South Africa
Hospitals in Johannesburg